William Ward Burrows may refer to:

William Ward Burrows I (Marine Lieutenant Colonel) (1768–1805), second Commandant of the Marine Corps
William Ward Burrows II (Navy Lieutenant) (1785–1813), the Colonel's son